The Masai xeric grasslands and shrublands is a Desert and xeric shrubland ecoregion in Kenya and Ethiopia. It includes the lowlands around Lake Turkana and the Chalbi Desert east of the lake.

The ecoregion is surrounded by Acacia–Commiphora bushlands and thickets – the Northern Acacia–Commiphora bushlands and thickets to the south and west, and the Somali Acacia–Commiphora bushlands and thickets to the north and east.

Protected areas
Protected areas include Lake Turkana National Parks in Kenya.

References

 
Afrotropical ecoregions
Deserts and xeric shrublands
Ecoregions of Ethiopia
Ecoregions of Kenya